Advances in Clinical and Experimental Medicine is a monthly peer-reviewed open-access medical journal published by Wroclaw Medical University Press covering all aspects of clinical and experimental medicine. It publishes original articles, research-in-progress, research letters, systematic reviews, and meta-analyses. The editor-in-chief is Donata Kurpas (Wroclaw Medical University).

History
The journal was established in 1992 as Postępy Medycyny Klinicznej i Doświadczalnej, obtaining its current name in 1998. The first editor-in-chief was Bogumił Halawa (1992–1997). He was succeeded by Leszek Paradowski (1997–1999). The next editor-in-chief of the journal was Antonina Harłozińska-Szmyrka (2000–2005), followed by Leszek Paradowski (2006–2007), Maria Podolak-Dawidziak (2008–2016), and Maciej Bagłaj (2017–2020). Donata Kurpas is the journal's editor-in-chief since 2020.

Abstracting and indexing
The journal is abstracted and indexed in Embase, Index Medicus/MEDLINE/PubMed, Science Citation Index Expanded, and Scopus. According to the Journal Citation Reports, the journal has a 2020 impact factor of 1.727.

References

External links

General medical journals
Monthly journals
English-language journals
Publications established in 1992
Creative Commons Attribution-licensed journals